The Association of Philippine Electric Cooperatives, also known as the APEC Partylist is a party list in the Philippines representing cooperatives in the electricity sector, mainly urban and suburban areas. Sunny Rose Madamba, Ernesto Pablo, and Edgar Valdez are the party's three representatives in the House of Representatives. In the 14 May 2007 election, the party won 2 seats in the nationwide party-list vote.

Electoral performance

Representatives to Congress

Party-lists represented in the House of Representatives of the Philippines
Cooperative parties
Cooperatives in the Philippines